Henrich Ručkay (born February 11, 1983) is a Slovak professional ice hockey left winger who is currently plays for Brest Albatros Hockey of the FFHG Division 1.

Ručkay played in the Tipsport Liga for HK Dukla Trenčín, HK Nitra, ŠHK 37 Piešťany and HC Nové Zámky. On October 3, 2019, Ručkay moved to Germany and signed for Oberliga side Essen Mosquitoes. He left after just four games however and joined French Division 1 side Brest Albatros Hockey on October 20.

References

External links

1983 births
Living people
Brest Albatros Hockey players
HK Dukla Trenčín players
Essen Mosquitoes players
HK Nitra players
HC Nové Zámky players
Sportspeople from Piešťany
ŠHK 37 Piešťany players
Slovak ice hockey left wingers
Yertis Pavlodar players
Slovak expatriate ice hockey players in Germany
Expatriate ice hockey players in France
Expatriate ice hockey players in Kazakhstan
Expatriate ice hockey players in Austria
Slovak expatriate sportspeople in Kazakhstan
Slovak expatriate sportspeople in France